Alice Margaret Geddes White (28 April 1908 – 3 August 2007), also known as Alicen White, was a British-American writer, playwright, editor, teacher and performer. She was on the staff of Girl Scouts of the USA for over 25 years.

Early life and education
Alice Margaret Geddes White was born in Carnoustie, Scotland on 28 April 1908 to John F. White, owner of Dundee Flour Mills and Mary White of Providence, RI. 
She attended the High School of Dundee between 1918 and 1924
until her father's business closed when White was 16 years old. The family moved to Vancouver, Canada, where she attended King George Secondary School. She gained a Bachelor’s degree from the University of British Columbia in 1929, having supported herself with several scholarships, including the University Scholarship for 1930–1931.  She earned a Master’s Degree in English Literature from Smith College, Massachusetts then went on to further graduate studies at Columbia University, New York. She studied acting at the Everyman Theatre School in London, in Vancouver and with Gene Frankel in New York.

Personal life
White became a naturalized American on 26 July 1943. She met her partner, Martha Davis Coe (1907–1986), an entertainment producer and composer for TV, while they were both working for the GSUSA. They lived together in New York City until 1971, when they moved to Rumson, New Jersey. White was a member of the Monmouth County Chapter of Zonta International. She moved to King James Nursing Home, New Jersey in old age.

Work
Between 1930–1934, White taught English and dramatics at Mary C. Wheeler School in Providence, RI. Working with fellow teacher Janet E Tobitt, she published her first book One Act Trips Abroad in 1931. They would go on to write four books together. She taught English and dramatics at Greenwich Academy, CN from 1938 to 1941. In 1941, White and Tobitt taught intensive folk-dance and dramatics courses at Purdue University, Indiana.

In 1943, White joined the American Red Cross as an assistant Program Director. She was stationed in Capri, Italy, Germany, England and North Africa. From 1947 – 1948 she taught at the University of Kentucky. She worked for the US Government’s Information and Education Department in Germany and England, returning to the USA in 1953.

In 1961, White and Coe established May White Corporation, through which they developed and sold Grandmother’s Favourite Furniture Cream, based on a recipe from White’s mother, and Wurry Beads, Lucite imitations of Worry beads.

She was a member of the Paravent Theatrical Company in Providence, RI and performed in several off-Broadway theatre productions in New York as well as in New Jersey and New England. Between 1976–1986 White and Coe wrote, produced and performed two two-woman shows Music Hall Favourites and Oscar Wilde and Wonderful as Coe-White Associates, appearing in New York and New Jersey. In 1989, White presented Ladies and Other Females, a one-woman show including excerpts from Shakespeare and Noel Coward.

Girl Scouts of USA
White credited GSUSA for “encouraging her creative talents”. She held many positions within the organisation, including Program Specialist, Advisor in the Leadership Bureau, Training Advisor, Advisor in the Training Division of the Personnel Department, Assistant to the Director of the Program Department and, for several years, Director of Dramatics at the Girl Scout National Training School. She was Associate Editor for the Girl Scout Leader magazine from 1959 to 1966, joining the Editorial Board in 1963.

Writing, editing and recording
White wrote in multiple genres including gothic romance, children’s fiction, Girl Scout articles, song lyrics and plays. Her literary agent was Frieda Fishbein.

Plays co-authored with Janet E. Tobitt
 One Act Trips Abroad (1931)
 Dramatized Ballads with Musical Accompaniment (1937) also with Barbara Danielson
 Plays for High Holidays with Incidental Dancing and Music (1939)
 The Saucy Sailor and Other Dramatized Ballads (1940)

Works for choral reading
Choral reading is reading aloud in unison as group to help build fluency and self-confidence.

 Anthology of Choral Readings (1944)
 A Bouquet of Poems, Selected and Arranged for Choral Speaking (1966) illustrated by Martha Coe. It included a 33.3 rpm record narrated by Joel Templeton.

Girl Scouts
White wrote pageants, productions for conventions and other special events, and many Girl Scout Leader articles. She also wrote:

 Dramatic Cues for Girl Scout Leaders (1937)
 Recruiting Volunteers (1955) with Margaret Delano
 Recruiting, Selecting and Placing Volunteers (1960)
 The Golden Promise: A Fiftieth Anniversary Ceremony for Girl Scout Councils (1962)
 It’s Up To Us! A Ceremony for Girl Scouts (1963) (an adaptation of the closing ceremony used at the 36th National Convention at Miami Beach)
 Brownies’ Own Songbook (1968) with music by Martha Coe. It sold over 150,000 copies

Lyrics
 My World In You (1959) with music by Martha Coe
 Until You Said Goodbye (1959) with music by Martha Coe

Gothic romance
Writing under the pseudonym Alicen White, she published five gothic romance novels, one of which Nor Spell Nor Charm, received the Edgar Allan Poe Scroll Award in the Best Paperback Original category at the 1972 Mystery Writers of America Awards. The books drew upon her experiences of growing up in Scotland.

 Dirge for a Lady (1968)
 Nor Spell, Nor Charm (1972) recipient of the Edgar Allan Poe Scroll Award, MWA Awards
 Evil that Walks Invisible (1973)
 The Traitor Within (1974)
 The Watching Eye (1977)

Musical plays
White wrote the book and / or lyrics to four musical plays, with music by Martha Coe.

Quite A Young Girl(1960) White and Coe, together with lyricist Peter Colonna, wrote the two-act musical comedy Quite A Young Girl, with a libretto taken from 9-year old Daisy Ashford’s best-selling novel The Young Visiters (1919). Several playwrights had previously attempted to adapt the novel for the stage, but none of their efforts was deemed acceptable by the author. Coe and White’s version was reported to have received the author’s blessing, but they ultimately failed to find a producer.
 The Absent Minded Dragon (1963) book by James Truax, musical director Anne McLarnon. It appeared at Stage 73, off-Broadway and ran for almost three years. The cast included Robert Campuzano, Ruth Coleman and Al Kavanagh.
 The Brownies (1964) a dramatized musical inspired by Juliana H Ewing’s story of the same name from 1865. It appeared at the Renata Theatre, New York, with White featuring in the cast and on an associated LP.
 The Enchanted Forest (1964)

Others
 The Actor’s Art and Job (1942) by Harry Irvine, for which White wrote the preface 
 The Last Train Out (1962) a screenplay, written with Mary Jean Parson, Susan Wayne and Martha Coe
 Folly to be Wise (1964) a comic play in three acts
 Walter in Love (1973) a children’s book, illustrated by Ruth Rosekrans Hoffman and dedicated to Coe. She was inspired to write it by her two dogs, Leo and Annie.

References

1908 births
2007 deaths
20th-century American dramatists and playwrights
Girl Scouts of the USA people
People from Carnoustie
People educated at the High School of Dundee
People from Rumson, New Jersey
Writers from New Jersey
University of British Columbia alumni
Smith College alumni
Columbia University alumni
American Red Cross personnel
American women dramatists and playwrights
Pseudonymous women writers
Women romantic fiction writers
Writers of Gothic fiction
American musical theatre librettists
British emigrants to the United States
Scottish LGBT writers
Girl Guiding and Girl Scouting
American lesbian writers
20th-century pseudonymous writers
21st-century pseudonymous writers